William Norman Pennington (March 24, 1923 – May 15, 2011) was an American casino industry executive. A pioneer in Nevada’s casino industry, he played a major role in establishing the Circus Circus company, including Excalibur Hotel Casino, Luxor and Mandalay Bay. He owned several properties in Las Vegas, Reno, Hawaii and elsewhere. For many years he was listed on the Forbes 400.

References

1923 births
2011 deaths
Businesspeople from Las Vegas
Businesspeople from Reno, Nevada
Neurological disease deaths in Nevada
Deaths from Parkinson's disease
People from Smith County, Kansas
20th-century American businesspeople